This is a list of the Sites of Special Scientific Interest (SSSIs) in the East Riding of Yorkshire, England. In England the body responsible for designating SSSIs is Natural England, which chooses a site because of its fauna, flora, geological or physiographical features. As of 2020, there are 50 sites designated in this Area of Search, of which 39 have been designated due to their biological interest, 14 due to their geological interest, and 3 for both.

Natural England took over the role of designating and managing SSSIs from English Nature in October 2006 when it was formed from the amalgamation of English Nature, parts of the Countryside Agency and the Rural Development Service. There are two unitary authorities in the Area of Search: Kingston upon Hull and East Riding of Yorkshire.

For other counties, see List of Sites of Special Scientific Interest by Area of Search.

Sites

Notes
Grid reference is based on the British national grid reference system, also known as OSGB36, and is the system used by the Ordnance Survey.
Link to maps using the Nature on the Map service provided by Natural England.
The River Derwent site extends into the county of North Yorkshire and so can be found on the list of SSSIs in North Yorkshire.

References

 
East Riding of Yorkshire